The Solomons flying fox (Pteropus rayneri) is a species of flying fox in the family Pteropodidae. It is endemic to the Solomon Islands archipelago.  The population abundance has been marked by periodic die-offs of generally unknown cause, including a major die-off in the 1980s.  Hunting may be a significant threat to the population.

References

Pteropus
Bats of Oceania
Endemic fauna of the Solomon Islands
Mammals of the Solomon Islands
Mammals described in 1870
Near threatened animals
Near threatened biota of Oceania
Taxonomy articles created by Polbot
Taxa named by John Edward Gray